Georges Gauthier (9 October 1871 – 31 August 1940) was a French Canadian archbishop of Montreal and the first rector of the Université de Montréal.

Biography
Born in Montreal, Quebec, the son of François-Xavier Gauthier and Marie Généreux, he was ordained a priest in 1894 and ordained a bishop in 1912. On 20 September 1939, he was appointed the third archbishop of Montreal and served until his death in 1940.

In 1917, he was appointed vice-rector of the Université Laval à Montréal and when it became an independent school in 1920 he served as the first rector until 1923.

References

External links
 

1871 births
1940 deaths
Roman Catholic archbishops of Montreal
Canadian university and college chief executives
20th-century Roman Catholic archbishops in Canada